Vankasar Church is a 7th-century Armenian church located in Agdam District of Azerbaijan.

It is built of cream colored stone, and it sits on a peak that allows it to be visible from several miles away.

See also
Armenian architecture

References 

Armenian buildings in Azerbaijan
Armenian Apostolic churches
Armenian Apostolic monasteries
Armenian Apostolic monasteries in Azerbaijan
Diocese of Artsakh
Churches in Azerbaijan